Kulchytskyi (BGN/PCGN 1965 Kul’chyts’kyy) is a Ukrainian surname.

 Ihor Kulchytskyi (born 1941), Ukrainian soviet footballer
 Stanislav Kulchytskyi (born 1937), Ukrainian historian
 Yuriy-Frants Kulchytsky (pol. Jerzy Franciszek Kulczycki, 1640–1694), Cossack and café owner

See also
 Kulchitskiy